The 1994–95 Courage League Division 4 was the eighth full season of rugby union within the fourth tier of the English league system, currently the regional divisions National League 2 South and National League 2 North, and the second using the name Division 4.  At the end of the season Rotherham finished as worthy champions, with just one defeat throughout the campaign to claim promotion to the 1995–96 National Division 3.  They were joined by runners up Reading, who despite finishing 5 points behind were still well ahead of the chasing pack.  It was quite an achievement by both sides who had only just been promoted into the division, having won their respective leagues the previous year.  

The relegation battle was keenly contested by three sides but in the end it was Askeans and Broughton Park who went down, with 8th placed Plymouth Albion just 1 point clear in safety, although their for/against points was far superior.  Askeans would drop to Courage League Division 5 South while Broughton Park fell to Courage League Division 5 North.

Structure
Each team played home and away matches against each of the other teams, playing a total of eighteen matches each. The champions and runners up are promoted to Courage League Division 3 while the bottom two teams are relegated to either Courage League Division 5 North or Courage League Division 5 South depending on their locality.

Participating teams and locations

League table

Sponsorship
Courage League Division 4 is part of the Courage Clubs Championship and is sponsored by Courage Brewery.

References

N4
National League 2 North
National League 2 South